Below is an incomplete list of diplomats from the United Kingdom to Bavaria, specifically Heads of Missions sent after the creation of the Kingdom of Bavaria in 1805, when diplomatic relations began in 1814 after the Napoleonic Wars. Before the Napoleonic War, Great Britain maintained a diplomatic mission to the Elector of Bavaria and (from 1777) to the Elector of the Palatinate following his succession to the Duchy of Bavaria.  This was often commonly combined with a mission to the Imperial Diet in Regensburg (Ratisbon).

Heads of Missions

Envoys Extraordinary and Ministers Plenipotentiary

To the Imperial Diet

1639 Sir William Curtius Nürnberg 
1642 Sir William Curtius Frankfurt
1649 Sir William Curtius Nürnberg
1689–c1694: Hugo Hughes Secretary
c.1694–1702: probably no mission
1702–1704: Charles Whitworth Resident
1707: Henry Davenant did not visit Ratisbon
1714–1716: Charles Whitworth, Envoy Extraordinary until 1710
1724–1725: Edward Finch

To Elector of Bavaria and to the Imperial Diet
1726–1727: Isaac Leheup Minster
1727–1745: no mission
1745: Thomas Robinson Envoy Extraordinary for special mission
1746–1758: Onslow Burrish Minister to Bavaria; also accredited to Diet 1750–1751
1758–1763: No representation due to Seven Years' War (probably)
1763: Philip Stanhope
1764–1765: William Gordon Envoy Extraordinary to Diet only
1765–1769: Fulke Greville Envoy Extraordinary to Bavaria; Minister to Diet
1769–1773: Lewis de Visme Minister Plenipotentary to Bavaria; Minister to Diet
1773–1776: Hugh Elliot Minister Plenipotentary to Bavaria; Minister to Diet
1776–1779: Morton Eden

Ministers Plenipotentiary to Elector Palatine and Ministers to the Imperial Diet
1780–1783: Hon. John Trevor
1783–1796: Thomas Walpole
1794–1798: Richard Shepherd Chargé d'Affaires
1798–1799: Hon. Arthur Paget
1799–1800: Robert Walrond Chargé d'Affaires
1800: William Wickham Plenipotentary
1799–1804: Francis Drake

To King of Bavaria
1804–1814: No diplomatic relations due to Napoleonic War
1814–1815: George Rose
1815–1820: Hon. Frederick Lamb
1820–1828: Brook Taylor
1828–1843: David Erskine, 2nd Baron Erskine
1843–1862: John Milbanke
1862–1866: Lord Augustus Loftus
1866–1871: Sir Henry Howard

Bavaria joined the German Empire in 1871 and the Head of Mission was relegated to Chargé d'affaires

Chargés d'affaires
1872–1876: Robert Morier
1876–1882: Sir Edward Stanton
1882–1885: Hugh MacDonell
1885–1903: Sir Victor Drummond

In 1903, the Head of Mission was promoted to Minister Resident and merged with that of Württemberg

Ministers resident
1903–1906: Sir Reginald Tower
1906–1908: Hon. Fairfax Cartwright
1908–1909: Lord Horace Rumbold Chargé d'Affaires
1909–1910: Sir Ralph Paget
1910–1914: Sir Vincent Corbett

References

Bavaria
United Kingdom
Bavaria-related lists